James Wilson (August 16, 1766 – January 4, 1839) was a U.S. Representative from New Hampshire, father of James Wilson (1797-1881).

Born in Peterborough, New Hampshire, Wilson attended Phillips Academy, Andover, Massachusetts, and graduated from Harvard University in 1789. He studied law and was admitted to the bar in 1792, commencing practice in Peterborough. He served as member of the State house of representatives 1803-1808 and 1812–1814.

Wilson was elected as a Federalist to the Eleventh Congress (March 4, 1809 – March 3, 1811). He was not a candidate for renomination in 1810 and resumed the practice of law, moving to Keene, New Hampshire, in 1815.

He died in Keene, January 4, 1839, and was interred in Woodland Cemetery.

References

1766 births
1839 deaths
Harvard University alumni
Members of the New Hampshire House of Representatives
Federalist Party members of the United States House of Representatives from New Hampshire
People from Peterborough, New Hampshire
People from Keene, New Hampshire